Ethiopian race may refer to:
 Ethiopian people
 Ethiopid race
 Negroid race, as defined by Johann Friedrich Blumenbach in Handbuch der Naturgeschichte (1779), peoples of most of Africa, Australia, New Guinea and other Pacific Islands